This is a list of Billboard magazine's Top Hot 100 songs of 1978. The Top 100, as revealed in the year-end edition of Billboard dated December 23, 1978.

See also
1978 in music
List of Billboard Hot 100 number-one singles of 1978
List of Billboard Hot 100 top-ten singles in 1978

References

1978 record charts
Billboard charts